Kocaeli Stadium or İzmit Stadium is a stadium in İzmit, Turkey. It was opened to public in 2018 with a capacity of 34,712 spectators. It is the new home of Kocaelispor. It replaced the club's old home stadium, İzmit İsmetpaşa Stadium.

International events hosted
On 8 October 2019, the stadium hosted the UEFA Women's Euro 2021 qualifying Group A match of Turkey against Slovenia.

References

Football venues in Turkey
Sports venues completed in 2018
2018 establishments in Turkey
Sports venues in İzmit